is a professional Japanese baseball player. He is currently a free agent having previously played pitcher for the Chunichi Dragons.

On 20 October 2016, Maruyama was selected as the 6th draft pick for the Chunichi Dragons at the 2016 NPB Draft and on 20 November signed a provisional contract with a ¥30,000,000 sign-on bonus and a ¥7,200,000 yearly salary.

After struggling with injury, Maruyama was demoted to a development contract for the 2020 season. After struggling with a hernial disc injury, Ishioka was demoted to a development contract for the 2020 season.

References

1995 births
Living people
People from Tokoname
Baseball people from Aichi Prefecture
Japanese baseball players
Nippon Professional Baseball pitchers
Chunichi Dragons players